The Baltic Course is a pan-Baltic business magazine. The first number was issued in 2000. Magazine's editor-in-chief is Olga Pavuka.

References

External links
 

Baltic states
Magazines established in 2000
Business magazines
Magazines published in Estonia